Boryspil Airport railway station serves Terminal D at Boryspil International Airport. It is served by Kyiv Boryspil Express trains direct to central Kyiv.

Services
The station has services running directly to Kyiv and Darnytsia provided by Boryspil Express, normally running every hour.

The station was opened on 30 November 2018 upon the completion of the Kyiv Boryspil Express Rail Link linking Boryspil Airport with direct non-stop services to Kyiv. Boryspil Airport is a dead-end passenger station, terminus for 19 km - Boryspil Airport line (which is a branch from Darnytsia to Hrebinka).

Since 2018, the station has been served by Southwestern Railways, part of the Ukrainian Railways. Adjoins the terminal directly. Journey time one way is 30–40 minutes.

Ticket price is UAH 100 and can be purchased at self-service terminals. Passengers can also buy tickets on the trains using contactless cards.

See also
Ukrzaliznytsia

References

External links

Southwestern Railways stations
Railway stations in Kyiv
Railway stations opened in 2018
Airport railway stations